Roulette, in comics, may refer to:

 Roulette (Marvel Comics), a Marvel Comics character who is a member of the Hellions
 Roulette (DC Comics), a female DC Comics character who runs a metahuman fighting place called The House

See also
Roulette (disambiguation)

fr:Roulette (comics)